Ag-Gel National Park — is a national park of Azerbaijan.

A big part of it is the Lake Ağgöl, an internationally recognized area of global importance which was declared as Important Bird Area (IBA) when it was placed in the list of Ramsar wetlands of international importance in 2001.

Description

Ag-Gol, situated in the Mil plain of the Kur-Araz lowlands has a semi-desert landscape and is an important overwintering and nesting place for birds.  Over 140 species of birds are found in the park, including 89 species of nesting birds (partridge, spoonbill, swan, teal, bustard, etc.). Approximately 30 specimens of charadriiformes and 24 specimens of anseriformers have chosen this reserve home for themselves. Some of the bird species living here such as Francolinus, white-tailed eagle, white pelicans (Pelicanus onocrotalus) and Dalmatin pelicans (Pelicanus crispus) are added to the "Red Book".

In addition to birds, the reserve is rich with 20 fish species such as pike, erythroculter, mongolicus and carp. However, it was much richer for its fish species in the past as it was connected with the River Kura. Furthermore, there are green toad, hylidae and lake trod in the reserve. Besides, it is possible to see the Caspian and swamp turtles, common and water grass snakes in the reserve.

Moreover, 22 species of mammals such as wild boar, coypu and jungle cat (Felis chaus) occur in the reserve.

The park is designed to protect the marshy ecological system, as the nesting and wintering places of migratory and water birds. Ag-Gol has been incorporated into the list of UNESCO's convention "On internationally important marshy areas as the residing places of birds"

See also
 Gizil-Agach State Reserve
 Nature of Azerbaijan
 National Parks of Azerbaijan
 State Reserves of Azerbaijan
 List of protected areas of Azerbaijan

References

External links
 Ag-Gel National Park Official Website - Ministry of Ecology and Natural Resources of Azerbaijan 
 National Parks: Ag-Gel National Park - Ministry of Ecology and Natural Resources of Azerbaijan 

IUCN Category II
National parks of Azerbaijan
Protected areas established in 2003
2003 establishments in Azerbaijan